David Anthony "Tony" Halmshaw (born 25 April 1946) is an English former professional rugby league footballer who played in the 1970s and 1980s.

Background
Tony Halmshaw was born in Dewsbury, West Riding of Yorkshire, England.

Playing career

International honours
Tony Halmshaw won a cap for Great Britain while at Halifax in 1971 against New Zealand.

Player's No.6 Trophy Final appearances
Tony Halmshaw played  in Halifax's 22-11 victory over Wakefield Trinity in the 1971–72 Player's No.6 Trophy Final during the 1971–72 season at Odsal Stadium, Bradford on Saturday 22 January 1972, and played  in Rochdale Hornets' 16-27 defeat by Warrington in the 1973–74 Player's No.6 Trophy Final during the 1973–74 season at Central Park, Wigan on Saturday 9 February 1974.

References

External links
!Great Britain Statistics at englandrl.co.uk (statistics currently missing due to not having appeared for both Great Britain, and England)
Shaw Cross Sharks → Hall of Fame
(archived by web.archive.org) Shaw Cross Sharks → Hall of Fame

1946 births
Living people
Castleford Tigers players
English rugby league players
Great Britain national rugby league team players
Halifax R.L.F.C. players
Rochdale Hornets players
Rugby league locks
Rugby league players from Dewsbury